Captain Marion Frederic Ramirez de Arellano (August 5, 1913 – May 15, 1980) was a submarine commander in the United States Navy and the first Hispanic submarine commanding officer. He was awarded two Silver Stars, the Legion of Merit, and a Bronze Star for his actions against the Japanese Imperial Navy during World War II.

Early years
Ramirez de Arellano (birth name: Marion Frederic Ramírez de Arellano Kimerer ) was born in San Juan, Puerto Rico, to Rafael Ramirez de Arellano and Lucille Josephne Kimerer.  When he was just a child, his parents moved for a short period of time to Athens, Georgia where he began grade school.  The family soon returned to the island and both his parents  Rafael W. de Arellano and Lucille Kemmerer Ramirez de Arellano found employment as professors at the University of Puerto Rico at Río Piedras. Ramirez de Arellano continued his education in Puerto Rico and after he graduated from high school, he attended the University of Puerto Rico for two years.

U.S. Naval Academy

In 1931, he was appointed to the U.S. Naval Academy by Theodore Roosevelt, Jr. who served as Governor of Puerto Rico from 1929 to 1932. Ramirez de Arellano excelled in sports in the Academy, earning varsity letters in soccer, tennis, and gymnastics. He also won the Society of the Cincinnati prize for highest standing in the course for the Department of Languages. He graduated from the Academy in 1935.

He served aboard as Gunnery Officer from 1935 to 1937. From 1937 to 1938, he attended Submarine School at Groton, Connecticut.

World War II

The Pickerel was training near the Philippines when on December 8, 1941 the islands were attacked by Japan. The Pickerel was ordered to patrol the coast of the islands and on her second war patrol she sank the Kanko Maru, a Japanese vessel, in the Gulf of Davao off Mindanao. He participated in five war patrols with the Pickerel and led the effort to rescue five Navy pilots and one enlisted gunner off Wake Island. He also contributed to the sinking of two Japanese freighters and damaging a third. For his actions, he was awarded a Silver Star Medal and a Legion of Merit Medal.

After a brief stint at the Navy Yard on Mare Island, he was reassigned to the USS Skate, a Balao class submarine. He participated in the Skate's first three war patrols and was awarded a second Silver Star Medal for his contributions in the sinking the Japanese light cruiser Agano, on his third patrol. The Agano had survived a previous torpedo attack by submarine .

He participated in his ship's war patrols 5, 6 and 7. On July 5, 1944, Ramirez de Arellano led the rescue of three downed Navy pilots in the Palau area. On December 4, 1944, the Balao departed from Pearl Harbor to patrol in the Yellow Sea. The Balao engaged and sunk the Japanese cargo ship Daigo Maru on January 8, 1945. Ramirez de Arellano was awarded a Bronze Star with Combat V and a Letter of Commendation.

In February 1945, Ramirez de Arellano worked with submarine relief crews in Submarine Division 202 and he served as Commander of Submarine Division 16.

Post-World War II
In May 1946, Ramirez de Arellano was named Commanding Officer of Submarine Base, Saint Thomas, U.S. Virgin Islands. He was War Plans Officer, Joint U.S. Military Group in Madrid, Spain from May 1955 to June 1957 and the Deputy Director of the Inter-American Defense Board in Washington, D.C. from July 1957 to July 1961. On July 1, 1961, Captain Ramirez de Arellano retired from the Navy.

Personal
Ramirez de Arellano was married to Mysie Isabel Judson, of Tacoma, with whom he had three sons. He died on May 15, 1980 at Andrews Air Force Base near Washington, D.C.

Miscellaneous
Ramirez de Arellano is described in Rick Riordan's young-adult novel The Blood of Olympus as being a great-great-uncle of the major character Reyna Ramirez-Arellano.

Awards and decorations
Among Ramirez de Arellano's military decorations were the following:

Further reading
"Puertorriquenos Who Served With Guts, Glory, and Honor. Fighting to Defend a Nation Not Completely Their Own"; by : Greg Boudonck; ;

See also

Hispanic Admirals in the United States Navy
List of Puerto Ricans
Puerto Ricans in World War II
List of Puerto Rican military personnel
Hispanics in the United States Navy
Hispanics in the United States Naval Academy

Notes

References

External links

 
UNDERSEA WARFARE Magazine article on Capt. Ramirez de Arellano

1913 births
1980 deaths
United States Navy personnel of World War II
Burials at Arlington National Cemetery
People from San Juan, Puerto Rico
Puerto Rican United States Navy personnel
Puerto Rican military officers
Recipients of the Navy Distinguished Service Medal
Recipients of the Legion of Merit
Recipients of the Silver Star
United States submarine commanders
United States Navy officers
United States Naval Academy alumni